Nicola Jane Upson (born 1970) is a British novelist, known for a series of crime novels featuring a fictional version of Josephine Tey as the heroine and detective.

Upson was born in Suffolk, England in 1970, has a bachelor's degree in English from Downing College, Cambridge, and lives in Cambridge.

Novels
An Expert in Murder (2008)
Angel with Two Faces (2009)
Two for Sorrow (2010)
Fear in the Sunlight (2012)
The Death of Lucy Kyte (2013)
London Rain (2015)
Nine Lessons (2017)
Stanley and Elsie (2019) – standalone novel
Sorry for the Dead (2019)
The Dead of Winter (2020)

References

External links
Official website (archived at the Wayback Machine)
Nicola Upson on Twitter
Nicola Upson on Facebook
2019 interview with author Jenny Wheeler

1970 births
Living people
British women novelists
21st-century British novelists
21st-century British women writers
Writers from Suffolk
Alumni of Downing College, Cambridge
People from Cambridge